The men's 400 metres hurdles event at the 2009 Asian Athletics Championships was held at the Guangdong Olympic Stadium on November 12–13.

Medalists

Results

Heats

Final

References
Heats results
Final results

2009 Asian Athletics Championships
400 metres hurdles at the Asian Athletics Championships